Phoenix Park F.C. was an English football club based in Bradford, West Yorkshire.

History
The team participated in the Yorkshire Football League and the Northern Counties East League.

References

Defunct football clubs in England
Defunct football clubs in West Yorkshire
Yorkshire Football League
Northern Counties East Football League